The Jerry Kent House is a historic house in Yuma, Arizona. It was built in 1905 for Jennie Kent, a schoolteacher. It was purchased by J. P. Yemen, a dentist, in 1920. The house was designed in the Classical Revival architectural style. It has been listed on the National Register of Historic Places since December 7, 1982.

References

 
National Register of Historic Places in Yuma County, Arizona
Neoclassical architecture in Arizona
Houses completed in 1905
1905 establishments in Arizona Territory